Samuel W. Frank (May 30, 1904 – April 17, 1973) was a former Democratic member of the Pennsylvania House of Representatives.

Formative years
Born on May 30, 1904 in Wilkes Barre, Pennsylvania, Samuel W. Frank was the owner of the Frank Trouser Co. and a district manager for Sears, Roebuck & Co.

Political and public service
A Democrat, Frank served as president of the Allentown Recreation Commission from 1950 to 1970, and as State Democratic Committeeman for Lehigh County from 1952 to 1954. Elected to the Pennsylvania House of Representatives for its 1955 and 1957 terms, he was unsuccessful in reelection campaigns during 1956, 1960, and 1962, but was reelected to the House for its 1965 term. He then served four consecutive terms, but did not complete his final term.

Death and interment
A sitting member of the Pennsylvania House, Frank died in Allentown, Pennsylvania on April 17, 1973.

References

Democratic Party members of the Pennsylvania House of Representatives
1973 deaths
1904 births
20th-century American politicians